Nicolás Emilio Fagúndez Sequeira (born February 20, 1986 in Salto, Uruguay) is an Uruguayan professional footballer.

Teams 
  Tacuarembó FC 2011-2015
  Galícia Esporte Clube 2014 (loan)
  San Marcos de Arica 2015–2016
  Águila 2016–2017
  Tacuarembó FC 2017
  Sonsonate 2017–2018
  Isidro Metapán 2018–2019

References 

1986 births
Living people
Uruguayan footballers
Uruguayan expatriate footballers
Tacuarembó F.C. players
San Marcos de Arica footballers
Chilean Primera División players
Expatriate footballers in Chile
Association football forwards
Footballers from Salto, Uruguay
Uruguayan expatriate sportspeople in Chile
Expatriate footballers in Brazil
Uruguayan expatriate sportspeople in Brazil
Expatriate footballers in El Salvador
Uruguayan expatriate sportspeople in El Salvador
Galícia Esporte Clube players
C.D. Águila footballers
C.D. Sonsonate footballers
A.D. Isidro Metapán footballers